The 1990 NCAA Division I Cross Country Championships were the 52nd annual NCAA Men's Division I Cross Country Championship and the 10th annual NCAA Women's Division I Cross Country Championship to determine the team and individual national champions of NCAA Division I men's and women's collegiate cross country running in the United States. In all, four different titles were contested: men's and women's individual and team championships.

Held on November 19, 1990, the combined meet was hosted by the University of Tennessee at Pine Lakes Golf Course in Knoxville, Tennessee. The distance for the men's race was 10 kilometers (6.21 miles) while the distance for the women's race was 5 kilometers (3.11 miles). 

The men's team national championship was won by Arkansas, their fourth team national title. The individual championship was won by Jonah Koech, from Iowa State, with a time of 29:05.00.

The women's team national championship was won by Villanova, their second team (and second consecutive) national title. The individual championship was won by Sonia O'Sullivan, also from Villanova, with a time of 16:06.00.

Qualification
All Division I cross country teams were eligible to qualify for the meet through their placement at various regional qualifying meets. In total, 22 teams and 181 runners contested the men's championship while 22 teams and 179 runners contested the women's title.

Men's title
Distance: 10,000 meters (6.21 miles)
Competitors: 22 teams, 181 runners
Full Results: MileSplit.com

Men's Team Result (Top 10)

Men's Individual Result (Top 10)
Runners in italics were not competing with their full team

Women's title
Distance: 5,000 meters (3.11 miles)
Competitors: 22 teams, 179 runners
Full Results: MileSplit.com

Women's Team Result (Top 10)

Women's Individual Result (Top 10)
Runners in italics were not competing with their full team

References
 

NCAA Cross Country Championships
NCAA Division I Cross Country Championships
NCAA Division I Cross Country Championships
NCAA Division I Cross Country Championships
Sports in Knoxville, Tennessee
Track and field in Tennessee
University of Tennessee